Danny Jon Boitano (born March 22, 1953) is an American former professional baseball pitcher, who played in Major League Baseball (MLB) from  to . Boitano holds the distinction of having been the Philadelphia Phillies' first round pick in the secondary phase of both the June 1972 and June 1973 amateur drafts. A highly touted prospect, he had also been drafted by the Milwaukee Brewers (seventh round,  1971), St. Louis Cardinals (18th overall pick in the first round of the January 1972 amateur draft, secondary phase) and Montreal Expos (second round, January 1973 amateur draft, secondary phase). He signed with the Phillies on June 19, 1973.

Phillies prospect
In his first professional season, Boitano got off to a fast start, going 8–3 with a 2.08 earned run average for the New York–Penn League Auburn Phillies. From there, his minor league numbers tailed off a little, and his win–loss record was 37–43 when he made his major league debut on October 1, 1978, in a 5–3 loss to the Pittsburgh Pirates. During Spring training the following season, he was traded to the Milwaukee Brewers for Gary Beare.

MLB journeyman
Boitano toiled in the Brewers' farm system for two seasons, making sixteen major league appearances when he was purchased by the New York Mets prior to the 1981 season. At the end of the season, he was traded with Doug Flynn to the Texas Rangers for Jim Kern (who was then packaged with Greg Harris and Alex Treviño for George Foster from the Cincinnati Reds). After one season in Texas, Boitano retired without having ever lived up to the early potential he showed.

References

External links

1953 births
Living people
Baseball players from Sacramento, California
American expatriate baseball players in Canada
Major League Baseball pitchers
Philadelphia Phillies players
Fresno City Rams baseball players
Milwaukee Brewers players
New York Mets players
Texas Rangers players
Oklahoma City 89ers players
Denver Bears players
Tidewater Tides players
Vancouver Canadians players
Reading Phillies players
Auburn Phillies players
Rocky Mount Phillies players
Spartanburg Phillies players